Meehan may refer to:

People
 Andrew Meehan, former national director of Australians for Native Title and Reconciliation (ANTaR)
 Ben Meehan (born 1993), Australian rugby union player
 Brian Meehan (born 1967), Irish racehorse trainer
 C. P. Meehan (1812–1890), Irish Catholic priest, historian and editor
 Daniel Meehan, a character on the HBO drama Oz
 Gerry Meehan (born 1946), retired Canadian professional ice hockey leftwinger
 James Meehan (disambiguation)
 Jim Meehan, American professional poker player
 John Meehan (disambiguation)
 Lew Meehan (1890-1951), American actor
 Martin Meehan (Irish republican) (1945–2007), Sinn Féin politician and former member of the Provisional Irish Republican Army
 Marty Meehan (born 1956), American attorney and politician
 Michael J. Meehan (born 1892), American stockbroker and the first person prosecuted by the Securities and Exchange Commission
 Pat Meehan (born 1955), member of the U.S. House of Representatives from Pennsylvania
 Patrick Meehan (1928–1994), British victim of a miscarriage of justice
 Shana Goldberg-Meehan, an American television producer and television writer
 Sylvia Meehan, Irish campaigner for the rights of women and older people.
 Thomas Meehan (botanist) (1826–1901), American botanist
 Thomas Meehan (writer) (1929-2017), award-winning American writer
 Tony Meehan (1943–2005), Irish musician

Other
 Meehan Auditorium is a 3,000-seat multi-purpose arena in Providence, Rhode Island, United States
 Meehan, County Westmeath, a townland in St. Mary's civil parish, barony of Brawny, County Westmeath, Ireland
 Meehan, Wisconsin, unincorporated community, United States

See also
 Meechan, another variation of the surname
 Mehigan, another variation of the surname
 McMeekin, another, usually Scottish, variation of the surname